Nadia Malm Hansen (born 22 October 1986) better known as Nadia Malm is a Danish singer most known for her collaboration with Svenstrup & Vendelboe.

She took part in the Danish reality television show Idols in season 2 in 2004 broadcast on TV 3. She came in bottom three in week 1 of the show on 12 October 2004 and was eliminated alongside Jacob. The series was won by Rikke Emma Niebuhr.

Despite the lackluster results in Idols, she continued with a musical career. Her collaboration with Svenstrup & Vendelboe brought her a No. 1 chart-topper on the Danish Singles Chart with the single "Dybt vand" featuring Nadia Malm. This was followed by another successful single by Svenstrup & Vendelboe entitled "Glemmer dig aldrig" again featuring vocals of Nadia Malm.

Discography 
Featured in

References

External links

1986 births
21st-century Danish women singers
Living people